Tournai (M941) is the third ship in the City / Vlissingen-class mine countermeasures vessels, and second to be built for the Belgian Navy.

References

Mine warfare vessel classes
Minehunters of Belgium